Robert A. Smith may refer to:
 Robert Allan Smith (1909–1980), Scottish physicist
 Robert Angus Smith (1817–1884), Scottish chemist who investigated environmental issues
 Robert Archibald Smith (1780–1829), Scottish composer
 Robert Augustus Smith (1869–1942), U.S. Hall of Fame racehorse trainer
 Bobby Smith (footballer, born 1933) (1933–2010), English footballer
 Bob Smith (comics) (born 1951), American comic book artist